The Lalganj Ajhara is a Tehsil in the Pratapgarh district of the Indian state of Uttar Pradesh. It is located 36 km away from the Pratapgarh headquarters and 142 km from the capital of Uttar Pradesh, Lucknow.

See also
 Ghuisarnath Temple

References

Pratapgarh district, Uttar Pradesh